Burov is a Slavic male surname, its feminine counterpart is Burova. It may refer to
Aleksandr Burov (born 1975), Russian football player
Atanas Burov (1875–1954), Bulgarian banker and politician
Boris Burov (born 1970), Russian-Ecuadorian Olympic weightlifter
Ilya Burov (born 1991), Russian freestyle skier
Olga Burova (born 1963), Russian Olympic discus thrower
Oleg Igorevich Burov, a fictional character in the television show The Americans

Russian-language surnames